Loved by Few, Hated by Many is the fourth solo studio album by the American rapper Willie D. It was released on October 24, 2000, through Rap-A-Lot Records/Virgin Records. Recording session took place at Hippie House Studio in Houston. Production was handled by Leroy "Precise" Edwards, Hurt-M-Badd, John "Swift" Catalon, Pimp C and Willie D, with J. Prince as executive producer.

The album peaked at number 124 on the Billboard 200 and at number 25 on the Top R&B/Hip-Hop Albums in the United States. Its lead single, "Dear God", made it to #78 on the Hot R&B/Hip-Hop Songs and to #4 on the Hot Rap Songs.

Track listing

Charts

References

External links

2000 albums
Willie D albums
Rap-A-Lot Records albums
Albums produced by Hurt-M-Badd